Troy Stanley Reddick (born December 12, 1983) is a former American football offensive lineman and personal trainer with John Charles' Air One Football Academy. He chose to sign with the Chicago Bears over the Cleveland Browns as an undrafted free agent in 2005. He played college football at Auburn University where he was an integral part of the undefeated 2004 season that culminated in a Sugar Bowl victory.

Reddick has also been a member of the New York Giants, San Jose SaberCats, Dallas Desperados, and the Arizona Rattlers. Having had the opportunity to hone his craft in the most physically dominant division of football, the SEC West, his experiences are invaluable to young lineman he trains. As the son of a former college QB and being a lifelong offensive lineman he contends, that his key to success is helping those around him accomplish their goals.

High school career

Troy is a 2002 graduate of Westover Comprehensive High School (Georgia). He was a three-sport athlete and two-way starter on the football team for which he earned the following accolades:  2× 1st Team Georgia Region 1-AAA, The Atlanta Journal-Constitution [Georgia] State Super 11, The Atlanta Journal-Constitution [Georgia] Top 50, The Atlanta Journal-Constitution Super Southern 100, Super Prep Magazine All-Dixie Team, Super Prep Magazine Georgia Top 15, rated as one of the top 30 offensive tackles in the nation by Rivals100.com, and Prep Star All-Southeast Region selection.

College career

Auburn University: He started 40 games split between guard and tackle. His four years starting at Auburn including the undefeated 2004 season that culminated in a SEC championship and a Sugar Bowl victory. He was 2x Associated Press All-SEC Honorable Mention selection. As a part of the winning-est class in Auburn history, helping them maintain a top three winning percentage in the country over three years. He had the opportunity to block for three NFL first round draft picks including Ronnie Brown, Carnell Williams, and Jason Campbell. Also second round draft pick Kenny Irons and fourth round draft pick Brandon Jacobs. Participated in the inaugural Las Vegas All-Star Game.

Professional career

Attended the 2006 NFL Combine. Signed with the Chicago Bears as an undrafted free agent was released and resumed camp with the New York Giants but was later released. In Spring 2007 while attending camp with the Arena Football Leagues San Jose Sabercats, he was drafted #1 overall in the NFL Europe draft. He chose to stay with the San Jose Sabercats and went on to lead them to the 2007 Arena Bowl Championship. He was traded to the Kansas City Brigade. Then acquired by the Dallas Desperadoes at 2008. He suffered a season-ending injury and the AFL filed for bankruptcy later that year. The AFL returned in 2010 and so did Troy with the Arizona Rattlers, proving that he could come back after a potential career ending leg injury.

Training and coaching experience

Trained with Tom Shaw former NE Patriots S&C coach and founder TSP. Trained with Kevin Yoxall former UCLA and Auburn University S&C coach. Trained with Rusty Jones former Buffalo Bills and Chicago Bears S&C coach. Trained with Chip Smith founder of Competitive Edge Sports. In 2010, Troy became the OL/DL coach of Cedar Grove Middle School after turning down several high school coaching offers. CGMS went undefeated in the regular season and lost the division championship game. Working with raw talent is something Troy is very passionate about.

External links

Arena Football League bio
Arizona Rattlers bio
Auburn Tigers bio

1983 births
Living people
Sportspeople from Albany, Georgia
Players of American football from Georgia (U.S. state)
American football offensive tackles
Auburn Tigers football players
Chicago Bears players
New York Giants players
San Jose SaberCats players
Dallas Desperados players
Arizona Rattlers players
Alabama Vipers players